Aquibacillus halophilus is a Gram-positive and moderately halophilic bacterium from the genus of Aquibacillus.

References

Bacillaceae
Bacteria described in 2014